Tinissa indica is a moth of the family Tineidae. It is found in China (Hainan and Yunnan), Taiwan, India, Sikkim and Bhutan.

The wingspan is 24−28 mm for males and about 30 mm for females.

References

Moths described in 1976
Scardiinae